SS Cap Trafalgar was a German ocean liner launched in 1913 for the Hamburg Süd line. In 1914, she was converted for use as an auxiliary cruiser during World War I. She was the first armed merchant cruiser sunk by a ship of the same class; she was destroyed by HMS Carmania, also a converted ocean liner, in a furious action in the South Atlantic in September 1914. It was the world's first battle between former ocean liners.

Early career
The passenger liner SS Cap Trafalgar was built at the AG Vulcan Shipyard on the Elbe River in Hamburg, Germany for the Hamburg-South America Line for their service between Germany and the River Plate (Río de la Plata). She was named after the Spanish Cape Trafalgar, scene of the famous Battle of Trafalgar in 1805. A three-funneled vessel of  length and  beam, she measured 18,710 GRT and could carry nearly 1,600 passengers (400 1st class, 276 2nd class, 913 3rd or steerage class. A triple-screw vessel, her outer propellers were powered by two triple-expansion steam engines with the centre one driven by an exhaust turbine.

When Cap Trafalgar began her maiden voyage on 10 April 1914 from Hamburg for South American ports in Brazil, Argentina and Uruguay, she was the largest vessel traveling on the South American service and among the most luxurious. Her upper decks included a swimming pool and a cafe in a greenhouse while her 1st class halls and stairwells were full of beautiful gold filigree, and her staterooms were furnished in the highest fashion of the period. She was the epitome of pomp, elegance, and Germanic engineering but when war was declared, her career among the socialites and wealthy of the world ended.

Sinking 

When war was declared in Europe in August 1914, Cap Trafalgar was in Buenos Aires and was laid up pending orders. As already planned, the German Imperial Navy requisitioned her as an auxiliary cruiser. At the same time, her third funnel, which was a dummy, was removed. She was armed with two 4.1 inch guns and six one-pounder pom-poms (named for the sound they made while firing), all manned by experienced naval personnel, and given the mission to sink British merchant shipping. She was given the codename Hilfskreuzer B (Auxiliary Cruiser B) and was commanded by Korvettenkapitän Wirth. After a fruitless initial cruise, Cap Trafalgar returned on 13 September to the secret supply base at Trindade Island to take on fuel from German colliers.

The RMS Carmania was a British ocean liner designed by Leonard Peskett and built by John Brown & Company for the Cunard Line. She was launched on 21 February 1905 and made her maiden voyage from Liverpool to New York on 2 December of the same year. Following the outbreak of World War I, Carmania was converted into an armed merchant cruiser, equipped with eight 4.7-inch guns, and put under the command of Captain Noel Grant.

It was at this base on 14 September that Cap Trafalgar was discovered by the Carmania which had been sent to flush out German colliers and small warships that might be using the inhospitable island as a base against British merchant shipping. Carmania spotted Cap Trafalgar's smoke early in the morning and some hours later was able to surprise the German ship with two colliers in the island's only harbour.

The Cap Trafalgar (disguised as the Carmania)'s only battle was against the real Carmania. Some accounts incorrectly allege that the Carmania was itself disguised as the Cap Trafalgar.

Both the captains of the Cap Trafalgar and the Carmania had realized that to fight a successful action, their respective vessels required plenty of room; so, the captains had separately steamed several miles from the outcrop of the Island of Trindade in order to gain the space required. The Cap Trafalgar also sent out encoded German messages, announcing the engagement with the Carmania, and the position as 35 degrees west, 26 degrees south, with a NNW heading. Then the two ships turned towards each other and began to fight, the Carmania firing too early and thus allowing the Cap Trafalgar to land the first blow. Carmania fared worse than her opponent in the ensuing two hours, being hit 79 times, was holed below the waterline, and had her bridge totally destroyed by shellfire. However, as the range closed her own guns began to inflict damage, and fires broke out on both ships, sailors lining the rails and firing machine guns at their opposite numbers as the ships came within a few hundred yards of each other. Neither ship had the fire control systems or ammunition hoists of a modern warship, so the action was fought in the style of Nelson's day, with ammunition being brought to the guns by hand and the guns firing as the target bore.

Just as it seemed that the fires on Carmania would burn out of control, Cap Trafalgar veered away, lowering lifeboats as she heeled over to port. A shell below the waterline had ruptured several compartments, and the ship was rapidly sinking, although the colliers were able to rescue 279 sailors from the wreck before she sank. Fifty-one were killed in the fighting or the sinking (other reports say sixteen or seventeen people died), including Captain Wirth. Carmania was equally damaged, listing severely, heavily flooded and burning, with nine men dead and many more wounded. It was at this point that Cap Trafalgar's contemporary, the armed merchant cruiser  arrived, seemingly to provide the coup de grace for the shattered ship. However, the Kronprinz Wilhelm's captain feared a trap, since many ships both German and Allied in the area had doubtless been listening to the SOS calls of the Cap Trafalgar, which, though in German code, had been supplemented by messages from the Carmania with the British code.  Since multiple warships were on their way to the location, and the Cap Trafalgar had presumably already sunk, the captain of the Kronprinz Wilhelm turned his ship about and sailed away without firing a shot.

The Carmania was barely afloat. She listed severely as fires burned and the communication and navigation equipment on her bridge were almost destroyed. She turned away and sped south, hoping to rendezvous with a British cruiser in the area. By the time she was rescued on the 15th, she was hardly seaworthy and most likely would have sunk if at sea for more than another day or two. The following day the Carmania was rescued and brought into Pernambuco by other units of the Royal Navy, whilst the survivors of the Cap Trafalgar were rescued by the collier Eleonore Woermann and taken to Buenos Aires. Most were interned for the duration of the war on the Argentine island of Martín García.

See also
 Battle of Río de Oro

Notes

Citations

References
 Edwards, B. (1995). Salvo! Epic Naval Gun Actions. Cassell. .
 Simpson, C. (1977). The Ship That Hunted Itself. Penguin Books. .
 Schmalenbach, P. (1979). German raiders: A history of auxiliary cruisers of the German Navy, 1895-1945. Naval Institute Press. .
 Niezychowski, A. (1928). The Cruise of the Kronprinz Wilhelm.

External links
 World War I Raiders
 Cunard: The Most Famous Ocean Liners in the World 
 Cap Trafalgar
 Images at Greatships.net
  Account of battle

Shipwrecks in the Atlantic Ocean
Ocean liners
World War I cruisers of Germany
World War I commerce raiders
Passenger ships of Germany
World War I shipwrecks in the Atlantic Ocean
Maritime incidents in September 1914
Auxiliary cruisers of the Imperial German Navy
Naval battles of World War I involving the United Kingdom
Naval battles of World War I involving Germany
Maritime incidents in Brazil
Conflicts in 1914
Atlantic operations of World War I
1913 ships